The State of New York Mortgage Agency (SONYMA) is a New York State public-benefit corporation created in 1970 by the state government of New York to provide affordable homeownership to low- and moderate-income New Yorkers. It offers affordably priced fixed-rate mortgages through several mortgage programs for eligible homebuyers. Each program offers competitive interest rates, low down payments, down payment assistance and no prepayment penalties. SONYMA offers its programs through a network of participating lenders throughout New York state who contract with the agency to offer SONYMA's programs to their customers. The mortgage loans are purchased from the lenders by SONYMA, which funds the purchases by issuing tax-exempt bonds. In 2017, it had operating expenses of $62.57 million, an outstanding debt of $2.533 billion, and a staff level of 275 people.

SONYMA also runs a Mortgage Insurance Fund (MIF) to provide insurance for mortgages made by commercial and public lenders to finance construction of affordable multifamily apartment developments. The MIF also provides mortgage pool and primary insurance for single-family mortgages purchased by SONYMA. The MIF is funded from a surtax on the recording of mortgages in New York State.

SONYMA is a subsidiary of New York State Homes and Community Renewal.

See also
 Empire State Development Corporation
 Federal Housing Administration
 Nyhomes
 New York State Housing Finance Agency
 State of New York Municipal Bond Bank Agency

References

External links
 nyhomes.org
 State of New York Mortgage Agency in the New York Codes, Rules and Regulations
 About the State of New York Mortgage Agency (SONYMA)
 History of the State of New York Mortgage Agency
 the NYSHCR website with SONYMA as a subsidiary

Public benefit corporations in New York (state)